This article presents the discography of American singer, songwriter, and guitarist Glen Campbell. Campbell recorded and released 60 studio albums and seven live albums between 1962 and 2017. He also lent his vocals to four soundtracks for motion pictures (True Grit, Norwood, Rock-a-Doodle, and Glen Campbell: I'll Be Me). He placed a total of 82 singles (one of which was a re-release) on either the Billboard Country Chart, the Billboard Hot 100, or the Adult Contemporary Chart, nine of which peaked at No. 1 on at least one of those charts.

Studio albums

1960s

1970s

AIn the UK The Glen Campbell Goodtime Album was released as The Glen Campbell Album including two bonus tracks from the Oh Happy Day album.
BHighwayman peaked at number 19 on the RPM Country Albums chart in Canada.

1980s

1990s

2000s and 2010s

ACompilation of previously unreleased demo recordings Campbell made for Elvis Presley. Includes one remixed track combining Campbell and Presley's vocals.

Live albums

AIn the UK the double album Glen Campbell Live was released as a single album.
BLive at The Dome – Doncaster, England – 1990

Compilations and re-issues

A Glen Campbell's Greatest Hits also peaked at No. 20 on the RPM Top Albums chart in Canada.
B Complete or partial rerelease of 1981 live album Glen Campbell Live, in some cases mixed with other recordings.

Album appearances
Below are listed albums by other/various artists on which Glen Campbell is (one of) the main performer(s) on one or several songs.

Singles

1958–1970

1971–1980

1981–1990

1991–2017

Notes
A^ Singles certified Gold by the RIAA.

Other singles

Guest singles

Christmas singles

Non-U.S. singles

B-sides

1958–1990

1991–1997

Non-U.S. B-sides

Videos

References

External links

Country music discographies
Discographies of American artists
Rock music discographies
Discography